Calista Kay Flockhart (born November 11, 1964) is an American actress. She is best known for portraying the title character on the Fox television series Ally McBeal (1997–2002), for which she received a Golden Globe Award in 1998 and was thrice nominated for the Primetime Emmy Award for Outstanding Lead Actress in a Comedy Series. From 2006 to 2011, she starred as Kitty Walker on the ABC drama series Brothers & Sisters, and between 2015 and 2021, Flockhart appeared as Cat Grant on the superhero drama Supergirl. In film, she is known for roles in The Birdcage (1996), A Midsummer Night's Dream (1999), and Things You Can Tell Just by Looking at Her (2000).

Early life
Flockhart was born in Freeport, Illinois, the daughter of Kay Calista, an English teacher, and Ronald Flockhart, a Kraft Foods executive. Her parents retired to Morristown, Tennessee, where her father lived until his death and her mother continues to reside. She has one older brother, Gary. Her mother reversed her own first and middle names in naming her Calista Kay.

Flockhart attended Mason Gross School of the Arts at Rutgers University–New Brunswick. People began recognizing Flockhart's acting ability when William Esper (Mason Gross theater director and Flockhart's acting teacher) made an exception to policy by allowing Flockhart to perform on the main stage. Though this venue usually is reserved for juniors and seniors, Harold Scott insisted that Flockhart perform there in his production of William Inge's Picnic. Flockhart graduated with a Bachelor of Fine Arts in theater in 1988 from Rutgers as one of the few students who successfully completed the acting course. Rutgers inducted her into the Hall of Distinguished Alumni on May 3, 2003.

Career

Early career
In spring 1989, Flockhart made her first television appearance in a minor role in an episode of Guiding Light as a babysitter. Also, she played a teenager battling an eating disorder on a one-hour afternoon special on TV. Flockhart made her professional debut on the New York stage, appearing in Beside Herself alongside Melissa Joan Hart, at the Circle Repertory Theatre. Two years later, Flockhart appeared in the television movie Darrow. Though she later appeared in films Naked in New York (1993) and Getting In (1994), her first substantial speaking part in a film was in Quiz Show, directed by Robert Redford.

Flockhart debuted on Broadway in 1994, as Laura in The Glass Menagerie. Flockhart received a Clarence Derwent Award for her performance. In 1995, Flockhart became acquainted with actors such as Dianne Wiest and Faye Dunaway when she appeared in the movie Drunks. In 1996, Flockhart appeared as the daughter of Dianne Wiest and Gene Hackman's characters in The Birdcage. Later that year, Flockhart starred in Jane Doe as a drug addict, though it was not released until 1999, over three years after filming ended. Throughout that year, she continued to work on Broadway, playing the role of Natasha in Anton Chekhov's Three Sisters.

Ally McBeal

In 1997, Flockhart was asked to audition for the starring role in David E. Kelley's Fox television series Ally McBeal. Kelley, having heard of Flockhart, wanted her to audition for the contract part. Though she initially hesitated due to the necessary commitment to the show in a negotiable contract, she was swayed by the script and traveled to Los Angeles to audition for the part, which she won. She earned a Golden Globe Award for the role in 1998. Flockhart also appeared on the June 29, 1998, cover of Time magazine, placed as the newest iteration in the evolution of feminism, relating to the ongoing debate about the role depicted by her character. Flockhart starred on the show until it was canceled in 2002.

Brothers & Sisters

Flockhart performed in a starring role as Kitty Walker, opposite Sally Field, Rachel Griffiths and Matthew Rhys, in the ABC critically acclaimed prime time series Brothers & Sisters, which premiered in September 2006 in the time slot after Desperate Housewives. The show was cancelled in May 2011 after running for five years. Flockhart's character was significant throughout the series' first four years, but her appearances were reduced for the 2010–2011 season, coinciding with the departure of TV husband Rob Lowe.

Other work
Flockhart played the role of Helena in A Midsummer Night's Dream, a 1999 film version of Shakespeare's play. In 2000, she appeared in Things You Can Tell Just by Looking at Her and Bash: Latter-Day Plays, later accompanying Eve Ensler to Kenya in order to protest violence against women, particularly female genital mutilation. Flockhart also starred in the off-Broadway production of Ensler's The Vagina Monologues.

In 2004, Flockhart appeared as Matthew Broderick's deranged girlfriend in The Last Shot. In the same year, Flockhart traveled to Spain for the filming of Fragile, which premiered in September 2005 at the Venice Film Festival. She was offered the role of Susan Mayer on Desperate Housewives but declined, and the role later went to Teri Hatcher.

In 2014, Flockhart landed a role in Full Circle second season, as mob boss Ellen. It was expected to air in 2015. This had been Flockhart's first acting role in three years, after her hiatus when Brothers & Sisters ended.

In 2015, Flockhart was cast in the television series Supergirl as Cat Grant, a "self-made media magnate and founder of CatCo" and boss to Kara (Supergirl's alter ego). The series premiered on October 26, 2015, on CBS. Due to the network's wish to reduce the show's budget, it was moved to sister network The CW after its first season, along with a move to filming in Vancouver. Flockhart remained with the show (albeit as a recurring character), despite her previous aversion to working outside Los Angeles.

In 2022, she played the role of Martha opposite Zachary Quinto in Edward Albee's Who's Afraid of Virginia Woolf at the Geffen Playhouse in Los Angeles. The production was directed by Gordon Greenberg and also starred Aimee Carrero and Graham Phillips.

Personal life

Flockhart has been in a relationship with actor Harrison Ford since their meeting at the Golden Globe Awards on January 20, 2002. They became engaged on Valentine's Day in 2009, and were married on June 15, 2010, in Santa Fe, New Mexico. The ceremony was presided over by Governor Bill Richardson and New Mexico Supreme Court Chief Justice Charles W. Daniels. Flockhart and Ford have one adopted son together, Liam Flockhart Ford (born 2001), whom Flockhart adopted at birth.

From 2004 to 2014, Flockhart served as the national spokeswoman for Peace Over Violence.

Filmography

Film

Television

Awards and nominations

References

External links

 
 
 
 
 
 

|-
! colspan="3" style="background: #DAA520;" | Theatre World Award
|-
 
 

1964 births
20th-century American actresses
21st-century American actresses
Actresses from Illinois
American film actresses
American Shakespearean actresses
American soap opera actresses
American stage actresses
Best Musical or Comedy Actress Golden Globe (television) winners
Clarence Derwent Award winners
Living people
Mason Gross School of the Arts alumni
People from Freeport, Illinois
People from Norwich, New York
Rowan University alumni
Rutgers University alumni
Shawnee High School (New Jersey) alumni